Raja Kuhaneswaran (born 15 May 1960; also known as Irasa Kuganeswaran) is a Sri Lankan Tamil politician and former Member of Parliament.

Kuhaneswaran was born on 15 May 1960. He is a Hindu.

Kuhaneswaran contested the 1989 parliamentary election as one of the Tamil Eelam Liberation Organization's candidates in Vanni District and was elected to Parliament. He was not re-elected at the 1994 parliamentary election.

Kuhaneswaran contested the 2000 parliamentary election and was re-elected. He was re-elected at the 2001 parliamentary election as a Tamil National Alliance candidate. He did not contest the 2004 parliamentary election after failing to get nominated.

References

1960 births
Living people
Members of the 9th Parliament of Sri Lanka
Members of the 11th Parliament of Sri Lanka
Members of the 12th Parliament of Sri Lanka
People from Northern Province, Sri Lanka
Sri Lankan Hindus
Sri Lankan Tamil politicians
Tamil Eelam Liberation Organization politicians
Tamil National Alliance politicians